Cupania elegans is a horticultural name (a name that has never been validly published in scientific literature) for a plant in the family Sapindaceae.

References

External links 

 Cupania elegans at the International Plant Names Index (IPNI)

elegans
Plants described in 1893
Nomina nuda